Me Gusta or variants may refer to:

"Me Gusta" (Inna song), 2018
"Me Gusta" (Natti Natasha song), 2018
"Me Gusta" (Mikolas Josef song), 2018
"Me Gusta" (Shakira and Anuel AA song), 2020, sampling Inner Circle's Sweat (A La La La La Long)
"Me Gusta", a 2014 song by Dj R'AN featuring José de Rico, Willy William & Anna Torres
"Me Gustas Tu" (GFriend song), a song by GFriend from the 2015 EP Flower Bud
"Me gusta" (Anitta song), 2020 song by Anitta featuring Cardi B and Myke Towers

See also 
Me gustas tú (disambiguation)
Me gusta, pero me asusta, a 2017 Mexican comedy film directed by Beto Gómez